This is a list of Carolina Hurricanes award winners. It also includes players and data from the previous incarnation of the franchise, the Hartford Whalers.

League awards

Team trophies

Individual awards

All-Stars

WHA First, Second and Third Team All-Stars

NHL first and second team All-Stars
The NHL first and second team All-Stars are the top players at each position as voted on by the Professional Hockey Writers' Association.

NHL All-Rookie Team
The NHL All-Rookie Team consists of the top rookies at each position as voted on by the Professional Hockey Writers' Association.

All-Star Game selections
The National Hockey League All-Star Game is a mid-season exhibition game held annually between many of the top players of each season. Thirty-three All-Star Games have been held since the Carolina Hurricanes entered the NHL as the Hartford Whalers in 1979, with at least one player chosen to represent the franchise in each year except 1998, 2004 and 2012. The All-Star game has not been held in various years: 1979 and 1987 due to the 1979 Challenge Cup and Rendez-vous '87 series between the NHL and the Soviet national team, respectively, 1995, 2005, and 2013 as a result of labor stoppages, 2006, 2010, and 2014 because of the Winter Olympic Games, and 2021 as a result of the COVID-19 pandemic. The franchise has hosted two of the games. Hartford hosted the 38th at the XL Center, then known as the Hartford Civic Center, and Carolina hosted the 58th at PNC Arena, then known as the RBC Center.

 Selected by fan vote
 All-Star Game Most Valuable Player

All-Star Game replacement events

Career achievements

Hockey Hall of Fame
The following is a list of Carolina Hurricanes who have been enshrined in the Hockey Hall of Fame.

Foster Hewitt Memorial Award
Two members of the Carolina Hurricanes organization has been honored with the Foster Hewitt Memorial Award. The award is presented by the Hockey Hall of Fame to members of the radio and television industry who make outstanding contributions to their profession and the game of ice hockey during their broadcasting career.

Lester Patrick Trophy
The Lester Patrick Trophy has been presented by the National Hockey League and USA Hockey since 1966 to honor a recipient's contribution to ice hockey in the United States. This list includes all personnel who have ever been employed by the Carolina Hurricanes franchise in any capacity and have also received the Lester Patrick Trophy.

United States Hockey Hall of Fame

Retired numbers

The Carolina Hurricanes have retired three of their jersey numbers and taken two other numbers out of circulation. Prior to the franchise's move to Carolina, the Hartford Whalers retired Rick Ley's number 2, Gordie Howe's number 9, and John McKenzie's number 19. Numbers 2 and 19 were returned to circulation when the franchise moved to Carolina, but the number 9 remains unofficially retired for Howe. The number 3 was removed from circulation following Steve Chiasson's death in 1999. Also out of circulation is the number 99 which was retired league-wide for Wayne Gretzky on February 6, 2000. Gretzky did not play for the Hurricanes franchise during his 20-year NHL career and no player in franchise history had ever worn the number 99 prior to its retirement.

Team awards

Josef Vasicek Award
The Josef Vasicek Award is an annual award given by the Carolina chapter of the Professional Hockey Writers' Association for "outstanding cooperation with the local media."

Most Valuable Player
The Most Valuable Player award is an annual award given by the Carolina chapter of the Professional Hockey Writers' Association to the team's MVP.

Steve Chiasson Award
The Steve Chiasson Award is an annual award given to the player who "best exemplifies determination and dedication while proving to be an inspiration to his teammates through his performance and approach to the game" as selected by his teammates.

See also
List of National Hockey League awards

References

Carolina Hurricanes
award